{{DISPLAYTITLE:Eta2 Pictoris}}

η2 Pictoris, Latinised as Eta2 Pictoris, is a solitary star in the southern constellation of Pictor. It is visible to the naked eye as a dim,  orange-hued star with an apparent visual magnitude of 5.02. It is a member of the HR 1614 moving group of stars that share a common motion through space.

This is an evolved K-type giant star with a stellar classification of K5 III, having exhausted the supply of hydrogen at its core, then cooled and expanded off the main sequence. At present it has 41 times the girth of the Sun. It is radiating an estimated 363.5 times the Sun's luminosity from its photosphere at an effective temperature of 4,136 K. This is a member of the old disk population and is a suspected variable star.

References

K-type giants
Suspected variables

Pictor (constellation)
Pictoris, Eta2
Durchmusterung objects
033042
023649
1663